Richard Nelson Frye (January 10, 1920 – March 27, 2014) was an American scholar of Iranian and Central Asian studies, and Aga Khan Professor Emeritus of Iranian Studies at Harvard University. His professional areas of interest were Iranian philology and the history of Iran and Central Asia before 1000 CE.

Born in Birmingham, Alabama, to a family of immigrants from Sweden, "Freij" had four children, his second marriage being to an Iranian-Assyrian scholar, Eden Naby, from Urmia, Iran who teaches at Columbia University. He spoke fluent Russian, German, Arabic, Persian, Pashto, French, Uzbek, and Turkish, and had extensive knowledge of Avestan, Pahlavi, Sogdian, and other Iranian languages and dialects, both extinct and current.

Although Frye is mostly known for his works about Iran, the Iranian peoples and Iranian Central Asia, the scope of his studies was much wider and includes Byzantine, Caucasian, and Ottoman history, Eastern Turkistan, Assyria and the Assyrian people, ancient and medieval Iranian art, Islamic art, Sufism, Chinese and Japanese archeology, and a variety of Iranian and non-Iranian languages including Avestan, Old Persian, Middle Persian, Parthian, Sogdian, Khotanese, and Bactrian, New Persian, Arabic, Turkish, and even Chinese, beside research languages which include French, German, Italian, and Russian.

Early life and career
Frye was born in Birmingham, Alabama. He first attended the University of Illinois, where he received a BA in history and philosophy in 1939. He received his MA from Harvard University in 1940 and his PhD from Harvard in 1946, in Asiatic history.

Frye served with the Office of Strategic Services during World War II. He was stationed in Afghanistan and traveled extensively in the Middle East, Central Asia, and South Asia. In 1948 he visited Sar Masshad, and was the first European to find and report the existence of the Gur-e Dokhtar tomb (meaning "Tomb of the Maiden" in Persian).

He returned to Harvard to teach. He was a member of the Harvard faculty from 1948 until 1990. He then became a professor emeritus at Harvard. He also served as faculty, guest lecturer, or visiting scholar at:
 Habibiya College in Kabul (1942–44)
 Frankfurt University (1959–60)
 Hamburg University (1968–69)
 Pahlavi University of Shiraz (1970–76)
 University of Tajikistan (1990–92).

Professor Frye helped found the Center for Middle Eastern Studies at Harvard, the first Iranian studies program in America. He also served as Director of the Asia Institute in Shiraz (1970–1975), was on the Board of Trustees of the Pahlavi University at Shiraz (1974–78), and Chairman, Committee on Inner Asian Studies, at Harvard (1983–89), and as Editor of the Bulletin of the Asia Institute (1970–1975 and 1987–99).

Among Frye's students were Annemarie Schimmel, Oleg Grabar, Frank Huddle (former US Ambassador to Tajikistan), John Limbert, and Michael Crichton, whose Hollywood film The 13th Warrior is loosely based on Frye's translation of Ibn Fadlan's account of his travels up the river Volga.

Frye was also directly responsible for inviting Iranian scholars as distinguished visiting fellows to Harvard University, under a fellowship program initiated by Henry Kissinger. Examples of such guests include Mehdi Haeri Yazdi (1923–1999), Sadegh Choubak, Jalal al Ahmad, and others.

Frye as a proponent of Persian culture

Frye felt that Persian civilization was under-appreciated by other Muslims, and Arab Muslims in particular. Frye wrote:

In August 1953, shortly before the fall of Mosaddegh, prominent Iranian linguist Ali Akbar Dehkhoda gave Frye the title: "Irandoost" (meaning "a friend of Iran").

In addition, Frye was a long standing supporter of Assyrian continuity, and valued the historical and ancestral connection between modern Assyrians and the Ancient Mesopotamians.

A ceremony was held in Iran on June 27, 2004 to pay tribute to the six-decade endeavors of Professor Frye on his lifetime contribution to Iranian Studies, research work on the Persian language, and the history and culture of Iran.

In his will, Professor Frye expressed his wish to be buried next to the Zayandeh River in Isfahan. This request was approved by Iranian president Mahmoud Ahmadinejad in September 2007.
Two other American scholars of Iranian Studies, Arthur Pope and Phyllis Ackerman, are already buried there.
In 2010 the Iranian government gave a house in Isfahan to Professor Frye in recognition of his services to Iranian studies.

On June 8, 2014, the family of Dr. Frye decided to cremate his remains after waiting more than 2 months for official Iranian permission to bury him in Isfahan. His death coincided with growing resentment by Iranian hard-liners over signs of reconciliation with the United States after decades of estrangement. It is not clear what the family intended to do with his ashes.

Richard Foltz dedicated his book A History of the Tajiks: Iranians of the East to Frye's memory.

Frye as a public speaker
Frye was a popular public speaker at numerous Iran-related gatherings. In 2005, he spoke at UCLA, encouraging the Iranians present to cherish their culture and identity. In 2004, he spoke at an architectural conference in Tehran, expressing his dismay at hasty modernization that ignores the beauties of traditional Iranian architectural styles (see Architecture of Tehran).

Bibliography
 Notes on the Early Coinage of Transoxania; Numismatic Notes, 113, American Numismatic Association, New York 1949 
 The Near East and the Great Powers, Harvard University Press, 1951
 Iran, George Allen and Unwin, London, 1960
 The Heritage of Persia: The pre-Islamic History of One of the World's Great Civilizations, World Publishing Company, New York, 1963. Reprinted by Mazda Publishers, 2004. www.mazdapublishers.com
 Bukhara: The Medieval Achievement, University of Oklahoma Press, 1965. Reprinted by Mazda Publishers, 1997. www.mazdapublishers.com
 The Histories of Nishapur, Harvard University Press, (Harvard Oriental Series, 45) 1965
 Corpus Inscriptionum Iranicarum, vol. III, Dura-Europos, London, 1968
 Persia (3rd edition) Allen and Unwin, London, 1969
 The United States and Turkey and Iran, Archon Books, 1971
 Sasanian Remains from Qasr-i Abu Nasr. Seals, Sealings, and Coins, Harvard University Press, 1973
 Neue Methodologie in der Iranistik, Wiesbaden, 1974
 The Golden Age Of Persia: The Arabs in the East, Weidenfeld & Nicolson, London, 1988
 
 The heritage of Central Asia from antiquity to the Turkish expansion Markus Wiener, Princeton, 1996
 
 
 Greater Iran, Mazda Publishers, 2005, 
 Ibn Fadlan's Journey To Russia, 2005, Markus Wiener Publisher,

See also
 Famous Americans in Iran
 Iranistics

 Other notable scholars of Iranian studies
 Mehrdad Bahar
 Mary Boyce
 Roman Ghirshman
 Michael Roaf
 James R. Russell
 Erich Schmidt
 Alireza Shapour Shahbazi
 David Stronach
 Ahmad Tafazzoli
 Ehsan Yarshater
 Abdolhossein Zarrinkoub

References

External links
Iranians pay tribute to Richard Nelson Frye, Mehr News Agency, July 5, 2004.
 Waghmar, Burzine. Obituary: Richard Nelson Frye (1920–2014). Societas Iranologica Europaea .
Professor Frye, a great American Iranologist wills to be buried in Iran another
Dr. Frye's statements at UCLA in March 2005
Photos of Dr. Frye's lecture at UCLA, March 13, 2005
Dr. Frye criticized the architectural development of modern Tehran.
Excerpts from The Greater Iran: A 20th-Century Odyssey, the memoirs of R. N. Frye
Dr. Frye's page at the Iran Heritage website
Dr. Frye's page at the Vohuman.org
Former President of Iran Mr. Khatami praised Dr. Frye
Frye, R. N. Reforms of Khosrow Anoushirvan, the Sasanian Shahanshah of Iran, The History of Ancient Iran, 1983.
 Syria and Assyria
Cover story on Dr. Frye in OCPC magazine
Frye, R. N. "Ethnic Identity in Iran." 2002.
Prof. Richard Frye’s Memoirs in Persian 

American historians
American Iranologists
American Turkologists
American people of Swedish descent
University of Illinois alumni
Harvard Graduate School of Arts and Sciences alumni
Harvard University faculty
Iranologists
People of the Office of Strategic Services
Academic staff of Shiraz University
1920 births
2014 deaths
Farabi International Award recipients
Zoroastrian studies scholars
American expatriates in Afghanistan
American expatriates in Iran
American expatriates in Germany
American expatriates in Tajikistan
Academic staff of the University of Hamburg